There are two rivers named Sarapuí River in Brazil:

 Sarapuí River (São Paulo)
 Sarapuí River (Rio de Janeiro)